Fräulein Mama is a 1926 German silent film directed by Géza von Bolváry and starring Grete Reinwald, Walter Janssen, and Ferdinand von Alten.

The film's sets were designed by the art directors Peter Rochelsberg and Otto Völckers.

Cast

References

Bibliography

External links

1926 films
Films of the Weimar Republic
German silent feature films
Films directed by Géza von Bolváry
Bavaria Film films
German black-and-white films
1920s German films